The 2003–04 daytime network television schedule for the six major English-language commercial broadcast networks in the United States in operation during that television season covers the weekday daytime hours from September 2003 to August 2004. The schedule is followed by a list per network of returning series, new series, and series canceled after the 2002–03 season.

Affiliates fill time periods not occupied by network programs with local or syndicated programming. PBS – which offers daytime programming through a children's program block, PBS Kids – is not included, as its member television stations have local flexibility over most of their schedules and broadcast times for network shows may vary. Also not included are stations affiliated with PAX, as its schedule is composed mainly of syndicated reruns although it also carried some first-run programs.

Legend

 New series are highlighted in bold.

Schedule
 All times correspond to U.S. Eastern and Pacific Time scheduling (except for some live sports or events). Except where affiliates slot certain programs outside their network-dictated timeslots, subtract one hour for Central, Mountain, Alaska, and Hawaii-Aleutian times.
 Local schedules may differ, as affiliates have the option to pre-empt or delay network programs. Such scheduling may be limited to preemptions caused by local or national breaking news or weather coverage (which may force stations to tape delay certain programs in overnight timeslots or defer them to a co-operated or other contracted station in their regular timeslot) and any major sports events scheduled to air in a weekday timeslot (mainly during major holidays). Stations may air shows at other times at their preference.

Monday-Friday

CBS note: Beginning in March 2004, CBS offered its affiliates two feeds of Guiding Light: one airing at 10:00 am and one airing at 3:00 pm (both Eastern). Before that time, CBS affiliates that aired Guiding Light outside of the network's recommended 3:00 pm Eastern timeslot had to tape-delay the program to the following morning.

Saturday

Sunday

By network

ABC

Returning series:
ABC World News Tonight with Peter Jennings
All My Children
Fillmore!
General Hospital
Good Morning America
Kim Possible
Lizzie McGuire
NBA Inside Stuff
One Life to Live
Power Rangers Ninja Storm
The Proud Family
Recess
This Week with George Stephanopoulos
The View

New series:
Lilo & Stitch: The Series
Power Rangers Dino Thunder
That's So Raven

Not returning from 2002–03:
Port Charles
Power Rangers Wild Force
Teamo Supremo

CBS

Returning series:
As the World Turns
Blue's Clues
The Bold and the Beautiful
CBS Evening News with Dan Rather
CBS News Sunday Morning with Charles Osgood
ChalkZone
Dora the Explorer
The Early Show
Face the Nation
Guiding Light
Hey Arnold!
Little Bill
The Price is Right
The Saturday Early Show
The Wild Thornberrys
The Young and the Restless

New series:
All Grown Up!
The Brothers Garcia

Not returning from 2002–03:
As Told by Ginger
Pelswick
Rugrats

NBC

Returning series:
Croc Files
Days of Our Lives
Endurance
Meet the Press
NBC Nightly News with Tom Brokaw
Passions
Scout's Safari
Strange Days at Blake Holsey High
Today
Trading Spaces: Boys vs. Girls

New series:
Jeff Corwin Unleashed
Kenny the Shark
Skunked TV
Tutenstein

Not returning from 2002–03:
Adventure Camp
Operation Junkyard
Prehistoric Planet

Fox

Returning series:
The Cramp Twins
Fox News Sunday
Kirby: Right Back at Ya!
NFL Under the Helmet
Teenage Mutant Ninja Turtles
This Week in Baseball
Ultimate Muscle: The Kinnikuman Legacy

New series:
Cubix (moved from Kids' WB)
Funky Cops
Martin Mystery
The Menu
Shaman King
Sonic X
Winx Club 

Not returning from 2002–03:
Back to the Future
Fighting Foodons
Pirate Islands
Stargate Infinity
Ultraman Tiga
WMAC Masters

UPN

Not returning from 2002–03:
Buzz Lightyear of Star Command
Digimon Frontier
The Legend of Tarzan
Recess

The WB

Returning series:
Jackie Chan Adventures
MegaMan: NT Warrior
¡Mucha Lucha!
Ozzy & Drix
Pokémon: Master Quest / Pokémon: Advanced
Scooby-Doo
Static Shock
What's New Scooby-Doo?
X-Men: Evolution
Yu-Gi-Oh!

New series:
Astro Boy
Codename: Kids Next Door
Teen Titans
Xiaolin Showdown

Not returning from 2002–03:
Cubix (moved to FoxBox)
The Mummy: The Animated Series
Rescue Heroes: Global Response Team

See also
2003–04 United States network television schedule (prime-time)
2003–04 United States network television schedule (late night)

United States weekday network television schedules
2003 in American television
2004 in American television